"My Hometown" is a 1984 single by Bruce Springsteen from the Born in the U.S.A. album. My Hometown may also refer to:

"My Hometown" (Instant Star episode), 2008 TV episode
"My Home Town", 1960 song by Paul Anka
"Husavik (My Hometown)", 2020 song performed by Will Ferrell and My Marianne for the film Eurovision Song Contest: The Story of Fire Saga

See also
My Home (disambiguation)
My Town (disambiguation)
Hometown (disambiguation)
My Home Village, 1949 Korean film
Hometown, My Town, 1959 album by Tony Bennett